Shaikh Ayaz University is a public university funded by the Government of Sindh in Shikarpur, Sindh, Pakistan. It was founded in 2018 and was named after renowned Sindhi poet Shaikh Ayaz.

References

2018 establishments in Pakistan
Public universities and colleges in Sindh
Educational institutions established in 2018
Shikarpur District